Maryam or Mariam  is the Aramaic form of the biblical name Miriam (the name of the prophetess Miriam, the sister of Moses). It is notably the name of Mary the mother of Jesus. 
The spelling in the Semitic abjads is mrym (Hebrew מרים, Aramaic ܡܪܝܡ, Arabic مريم), which may be transliterated in a number of ways (Miryam, Miriyam, Mirijam, Marium, Maryam, Mariyam, Marijam, Meryem, Merjeme, etc.)

Via its use in the New Testament the name has been adopted worldwide, especially in Roman Catholicism, but also in Eastern Christianity, in Protestantism, and in Islam. 
In Latin Christianity, the Greek form Mariam was adopted as latinate Maria (whence French Marie and English  Mary). 
Forms retaining the final -m are found throughout the Middle East, in Arabic, Armenian, Georgian, Urdu, and Persian, as well as the Horn of Africa, including Amharic, Tigrinya, and Somali,  Turkish and Azerbaijani Məryəm and in Malayalam as Mariyam in south India.

Etymology

The name may have originated from the Egyptian language; in a suggestion going back to 1897,
it is possibly derivative of the root mr "love; beloved"  (compare mry.t-ymn "Merit-Amun", i.e. "beloved of Amun").
Maas (1912) references (but rejects) a 1906 suggestion interpreting the name as "beloved of Yahweh".
Maas (1912) further proposes possible derivation from  Hebrew, either from marah  "to be rebellious", or (more likely) from mara "well nourished".

The name has a long tradition of scholarly etymologisation; some seventy suggestions are treated by
Otto Bardenhewer in monographic form in his Der Name Maria (1895).
It was early etymologized as containing the Hebrew root mr "bitter" (cf. myrrh), or mry "rebellious". St. Jerome (writing c. 390), following Eusebius of Caesarea, translates the name as "drop of the sea" (stilla maris in Latin), from Hebrew מר mar "drop" (cf. Isaiah 40:15) and ים yam "sea". 
This translation was subsequently rendered stella maris ("star of the sea") due to scribal error, whence the Virgin Mary's title Star of the Sea. 
Rashi, an 11th-century Jewish commentator on the Bible, wrote that the name was given to the sister of Moses because of the Egyptians' harsh treatment of Jews in Egypt. Rashi wrote that the Israelites lived in Egypt for two hundred ten years, including eighty-six years of cruel enslavement that began at the time Moses' elder sister was born. Therefore, the girl was called Miriam, because the Egyptians made life bitter (מַר, mar) for her people.

Modern given name
Modern given names derived from Aramaic Maryam are frequent in Christian culture, as well as, due to the Quranic tradition of Mary, extremely frequently given in Islamic cultures. There are a large number of variants and derivations.

The New Testament gives the name as both  Mariam (Μαριάμ) and Maria (Μαρία).
The Latin Vulgate uses the first declension, Maria.

Maryam is the now-usual English-language rendition of the Arabic name.
The spelling Mariyam (in German-language contexts also Marijam) is sometimes used as a close transcription from Hebrew, Aramaic or Arabic.

The spelling Mariam is current in transliteration from Georgian and Armenian, and in German-language transliteration from Aramaic or Arabic.
Mariam was also a current spelling in early modern English, as in the Jacobean era play The Tragedy of Mariam.

Derived names
Maryam as the name of Mary mother of Jesus is also part of given names consisting of genitive constructions (idafa) in Ethiopian tradition, such as Haile Mariam "power of Mary",

Baeda Maryam "Hand of Mary", several people
Newaya Maryam "Property of Mary" or Takla Maryam "Plant of Mary", used as masculine given names. In Arabic, Marwan, meaning "one who is fragrant like myrrh", could be the masculine form of Maryam.

Ustad Ali Maryam, architect in 19th century Persia, added Maryam to his name after building a house for an important woman with that name.

People named Maryam

Notable people with the name Maryam
 Maryam Abacha (born 1945), widow of Sani Abacha, de facto President of Nigeria from 1993 to 1998
 Maryam Babangida (1948–2009), wife of Nigeria's head of state from 1985 to 1993
 Maryam d'Abo (born 1960), English film and television actress
 Maryam Fatima, Pakistani actress
 Maryam Khan (born 1989), American politician
 Maryam Matar (born 1975), Emirati geneticist and medical researcher
 Maryam Mirzakhani (1977–2017), Iranian mathematician
 Maryam Monsef (born 1984), Afghan Canadian politician
 Maryam Nemazee, Iranian British broadcast journalist
 Maryam Nawaz Sharif (born 1973), Pakistani politician
 Maryam Omar (born 1993), Kuwaiti-born Palestinian cricketer
 Maryam Rajavi (born 1953), leader of the People's Mujahedin of Iran
 Maryam Salour (born 1954), Iranian visual artist
 Maryam Shanechi, Iranian-American neuro engineers
 Maryam Yakubova (born 1931), Uzbek educator 
 Maryam Zakaria, Swedish-Iranian actress
 Maryam Tanveer Ali, popularly known as Maya Ali, Pakistani television actress
 Mariam Mamadashvili Winner of Junior Eurovision Song Contest 2016

Notable people with spelling variations of the name Maryam
 Mariam A. Aleem (1930–2010), Egyptian artist and academic
 Mariam Ansari, Pakistani film actress
 Marriyum Aurangzeb, Pakistani politician
 Mariam Brahim (born 1956), Chadian physician
 Mariam Mirza, Pakistani television actress and beautician
 Marium Mukhtiar, a Pakistan Air Force pilot who died in fighter jet crash
 Mariyam Nafees, Pakistani television actress

See also 

 Maryam (disambiguation)
 Miriam (given name)
 Maria (given name)
 Mary in Islam

References

Arabic feminine given names
Bosnian feminine given names
Lebanese feminine given names
Pakistani feminine given names
Aramaic-language names
Coptic given names